Nicola Cerfontyne (born 12 September 1987) is an English former badminton player and a two times national champion.

Biography 
Cerfontyne became a double English National champion after winning the English National Badminton Championships women's singles title in 2011 and 2015.

In 2017, she moved to Denmark after joining the Holbaek Centre of Excellence as a coach.

References

External links 
 Profile at www.nickycerfontyne.co.uk

1987 births
Living people
Sportspeople from Bournemouth
English female badminton players